North American area code 605 is the telephone area code serving the entire state of South Dakota, and is one of the area codes that was created in 1947. It is also one of a gradually decreasing number of single-state, single LATA, single area code areas. (North Dakota uses only the area code 701, but is split into two LATAs, one of which includes Minnesota.)

Before October 2021, area code 605 had telephone numbers assigned for the central office code 988. In 2020, 988 was designated nationwide as a dialing code for the National Suicide Prevention Lifeline, which created a conflict for exchanges that permit seven-digit dialing. Area code 605 was therefore scheduled to transition to ten-digit dialing by October 24, 2021.

Communities included
 Aberdeen: 216, 225, 226, 228, 229, 252, 262, 277, 290, 377, 380, 622, 626, 715, 725, 824, 846
 Alcester: 934
 Alexandria: 239
 Alpena: 849
 Andover: 298
 Arlington: 315, 983
 Armour: 572, 724,
 Artesian: 527
 Astoria: 832
 Avon: 286
 Baltic: 529
 Belle Fourche: 210, 568, 569, 699, 723, 892
 Belvidere: 344
 Beresford: 300, 751, 763, 957
 Big Stone City: 541, 862
 Bison: 244
 Blunt: 962
 Bonesteel: 654
 Bowdle: 281, 282, 285
 Bradley: 784
 Brandon: 582, 839
 Brandt: 876
 Bridgewater: 729
 Bristol: 492
 Britton: 448, 470, 551
 Brookings: 560, 592, 651, 688, 690, 691, 692, 693, 695, 697
 Buffalo: 375
 Buffalo Gap: 833
 Burke: 775
 Camp Crook: 797
 Canistota: 296
 Canova: 523
 Canton: 558, 764, 836, 987
 Castlewood: 414, 793, 804
 Cavour: 599
 Center: 247
 Centerville: 552, 563
 Chamberlain: 234, 730, 734, 815, 888
 Claire City: 652
 Claremont: 294
 Clark: 233, 532, 844
 Clear Lake: 874
 Colton: 446, 671
 Columbia: 396
 Conde: 382
 Corsica: 946
 Cresbard: 324
 Crooks: 465, 543
 Custer: 440, 517, 673
 Dell Rapids: 428, 963
 Delmont: 779
 De Smet: 854, 860, 861
 Doland: 635
 Dupree: 200, 365, 538, 821
 Eagle Butte: 218, 964
 Edgemont: 662
 Elk Point: 205, 356, 761, 952
 Elkton: 542, 922
 Emery: 449
 Estelline: 686, 873
 Ethan: 227
 Eureka: 284
 Faith: 739, 967
 Faulkton: 598
 Flandreau: 530, 534, 573, 633, 684, 864, 997
 Florence: 758
 Fort Pierre: 220, 222, 223, 224, 280, 295, 301, 494, 609, 773, 776, 945
 Frederick: 329
 Freeman: 925
 Garretson: 594
 Gary: 272
 Gettysburg: 765, 769, 771
 Glenham: 762, 848, 850
 Goodwin: 795
 Gregory: 830, 831, 835
 Groton: 397
 Harrisburg: 213, 214, 368, 408, 498, 667, 743, 767, 777
 Harrold: 875
 Hartford: 528, 953
 Hayti: 783, 792
 Hecla: 994
 Hermosa: 255
 Herreid: 437
 Highmore: 478, 852, 870, 871
 Hill City: 307, 574
 Hitchcock: 266
 Hosmer: 283
 Hot Springs: 745, 890, 891
 Hoven: 948
 Howard: 579, 772, 851
 Hudson: 984
 Humboldt: 363
 Hurley: 238
 Huron: 350, 352, 353, 354, 412, 461, 554, 570, 931, 936, 960, 968
 Interior: 433
 Ipswich: 410, 426
 Irene: 263
 Iroquois: 546
 Isabel: 466
 Jefferson: 966
 Kadoka: 488, 837
 Kennebec: 869
 Keystone: 666
 Kimball: 680, 682, 778
 Lake Andes: 469, 481, 487, 491
 Lake Norden: 710, 785
 Langford: 493
 Lebanon: 768
 Lemmon: 374
 Lennox: 647, 744, 750
 Leola: 439
 Lesterville: 364, 
 Letcher: 248
 Long Lake: 577
 McIntosh: 273, 524
 McLaughlin: 314
 Madison: 256, 270, 291, 427, 480, 556, 636
 Marion: 648
 Martin: 407, 441, 454, 685, 899, 944, 970, 980
 Mellette: 887
 Menno: 387
 Midland: 843
 Milbank: 432, 434, 438, 445, 467, 924, 949
 Miller: 204, 453, 853, 893
 Mission: 319, 828, 856
 Mitchell: 292, 299, 550, 597, 630, 656, 770, 933, 990, 995, 996, 999
 Mobridge: 230, 823, 845, 926
 Mound City: 955
 Mount Vernon: 236
 Murdo: 516, 669
 New Effington: 637
 New Holland: 243
 Newell: 456
 New Underwood: 754
 Nisland: 257
 North Cody: 822
 North Naper: 834
 North Sioux City: 217, 232, 235, 242, 422, 540, 585, 780, 979
 Nunda: 586
 Oelrichs: 535
 Oldham: 482
 Onaka: 447
 Onida: 973
 Orient: 392
 Parker: 297
 Parkston: 505, 928
 Peever: 932
 Philip: 859
 Pierpont: 325
 Pierre: 220, 222, 223, 224, 280, 295, 301, 494, 609, 773, 776, 945
 Plankinton: 942
 Platte: 207, 337, 613
 Pollock: 889
 Presho: 895
 Pukwana: 894
 Quinn: 386
 Ramona: 482
 Rapid City: 209, 219, 341, 342, 343, 348, 355, 381, 385, 388, 389, 390, 391, 393, 394, 399, 415, 430, 431, 484, 519, 545, 593, 600, 646, 716, 718, 719, 721, 727, 737, 755, 786, 787, 791, 858, 863, 872, 877, 923, 939
 Redfield: 302, 313, 450, 460, 468, 472, 475
 Ree Heights: 943
 Reliance: 473
 Revillo: 623
 Roscoe: 276, 287
 Rosholt: 537
 Roslyn: 420, 486
 Salem: 240, 421, 425, 471
 Scotland: 583
 Selby: 643, 649
 Seneca: 436
 Sinai: 826
 Sioux Falls: 201, 212, 215, 221, 231, 241, 250, 251, 254, 261, 271, 274, 275, 305, 306, 310, 312, 321, 322, 323, 328, 330, 331, 332, 333, 334, 335, 336, 338, 339, 351, 357, 359, 360, 361, 362, 366, 367, 370, 371, 373, 376, 400, 403, 404, 413, 444, 496, 504, 509, 521, 553, 575, 595, 610, 679, 681, 705, 728, 731, 740, 759, 782, 789, 799, 800, 809, 838, 900, 906, 929, 937, 940, 941, 951, 961, 965, 977, 978, 988
 Sisseton: 268, 419, 698, 742, 927
 South Shore: 756
 Spearfish: 269, 340, 443, 549, 559, 566, 571, 578, 580, 584, 591, 631, 639, 641, 642, 644, 645, 717, 722, 920
 Spencer: 246
 Springfield: 369
 Stickney: 732
 Stockholm: 676
 Sturgis: 206, 347, 423, 490, 499, 561, 702, 720
 Summit: 398
 Tabor: 463
 Tea: 213, 214, 368, 408, 498, 667, 743, 767, 777
 Timber Lake: 865
 Tolstoy: 442
 Toronto: 794
 Tripp: 935
 Tulare: 596
 Turton: 897
 Tyndall: 464, 589
 Valley Springs: 757
 Veblen: 738
 Vermillion: 202, 581, 624, 638, 658, 659, 670, 672, 675, 677, 741
 Viborg: 326, 766
 Volga: 627, 827, 930
 Wagner: 384
 Wakonda: 267, 451
 Wall: 279, 515
 Wasta: 993
 Watertown: 237, 520, 753, 818, 868, 878, 880, 881, 882, 884, 886, 954, 956
 Waubay: 435, 947
 Webster: 265, 345, 588, 590
 Wentworth: 483
 Wessington: 458
 West Jasper: 349
 White: 304, 629
 White Lake: 249
 White River: 259
 Wilmot: 938
 Winner: 208, 840, 841, 842
 Wolsey: 497, 883
 Wood: 452
 Woonsocket: 796
 Worthing: 372
 Yankton: 260, 500, 653, 655, 660, 661, 664, 665, 668, 689, 760, 857, 975 
 Premium calls (unassigned): 211, 308, 311, 320, 402, 406, 411, 476, 507, 511, 531, 536, 555, 605, 611, 621, 663, 700, 701, 711, 712, 811, 911, 921, 950, 958, 959, 976, 988 (come October 2021).

References
539 is wessington springs  in jerauld County

External links

605
605
Telecommunications-related introductions in 1947